List of channels, straits and passages in Hong Kong

See also
List of islands and peninsulas of Hong Kong
List of places in Hong Kong
List of buildings and structures in Hong Kong

External links
Harbours, channels and bays in Hong Kong

 
Channels